Step by Step: The Greatest Hits is the third compilation album released by Scottish pop rock quartet Wet Wet Wet. Released on 25 November 2013, the album features three previously unreleased recordings, "Step by Step", "Sad Kinda Love", and "Playin' Like a Kid". "Step by Step" was also released as the lead single from the album a week prior to its release. The album peaked at #53 on the UK Albums Chart, becoming the band's lowest charting release to date.

The album was promoted with a ten-date tour of the UK, which saw the band was supported by Blue. All ten dates on the tour were recorded for a series of live albums by Abbey Road Studios as part of their Live Here Now releases. The final date of the tour was also recorded for a DVD release, which was initially given away as a free gift to those who purchased a full set of the live albums. The live DVD was later released commercially on 29 September 2014.

Track listing

Step by Step: The Tour

Certifications

References

Wet Wet Wet albums
2013 greatest hits albums